In 1666, the French built a fort, on Isle La Motte, to protect Canada from the Iroquois. The fort was dedicated to Saint Anne. Fort Sainte Anne was the most vulnerable to attacks by the Iroquois, because it was the last of five forts stretching along the Richelieu River going south. The other four were Fort Richelieu, Fort Chambly, Fort Sainte Thérèse and Fort Saint-Jean.
Alexandre de Prouville de Tracy had the forts built by four companies of the Carignan-Salières Regiment.  The first three forts were built in 1665, and the other two in 1666.  By the end of 1665, three of the five Iroquois Nations made peace in Quebec City.  The Canadien Governor, Daniel de Courcelle, sent Tracy in the Fall of 1666 with 1,200 men, along with Hurons and Algonquins to attack the two Iroquois Nations resisting, the Mohawks and the Oneidas.  The Mohawks ran away into the forest, and the following year, peace was made with the two Nations.  The peace continued for seventeen years.

References

Sainte Anne
French-American culture in Vermont
Buildings and structures in Isle La Motte, Vermont
1666 establishments in Canada